Kim Townsend is an Australian kickboxer, Nak Muay, and the current ISKA World Flyweight Muay Thai champion. She is the former WMC Oceania and WKN Australia Flyweight champion.

Kickboxing career
Kim Townsend participated in the 2012 S-Cup tournament. She lost a unanimous decision to Rena Kubota in the quarter finals.

During Epic FP 11, she fought against Nuengsian Sitpolek and won a unanimous decision.

Townsend won the WMC Oceania title with a decision win over Michelle Preston.

During Krush 88, she fought Kan Morimoto, and ended up losing a unanimous decision, after an extra round.

She won the ISKA Muaythai Flyweight title with a decision win over Nyrene Crowley during Total Kaos 3.

Championships and accomplishments
International Sport Karate Association
ISKA World Muaythai Flyweight champion
Destiny Muay Thai
Destiny Muay Thai Flyweight champion
World Muaythai Council
WMC Oceania Flyweight champion
World Kickboxing Network
WKN Australia Flyweight champion

Muay Thai record
{{Kickboxing record start|norec=y|title=Kickboxing record|record=21 wins, 7 losses, 1 draw}}
|-  bgcolor="#CCFFCC"
| 11 Apr 2020|| Win||align=left| Emma Graham || Nemesis 11 || Perth, Australia || Decision (Unanimous) || 5 || 2:00
|-
|-  bgcolor="#CCFFCC"
| 15 Feb 2020|| Win||align=left| Rachael Kavanagh || Knees of Fury 80 || Perth, Australia || Decision (Split) || 5 || 2:00
|-
! style=background:white colspan=9 |
|-
|-  bgcolor="#CCFFCC"
| 1 Jun 2019|| Win||align=left| Nyrene Crowley || Total Kaos 3 || Brisbane, Australia || Decision (Unanimous) || 5 || 2:00
|-
! style=background:white colspan=9 |
|-
|-  bgcolor="#CCFFCC"
| 13 Apr 2019|| Win||align=left| Marina Verissimo || Destiny Muay Thai 12 || Perth, Australia || Decision (Unanimous) || 5 || 2:00
|-
! style=background:white colspan=9 |
|-
|-  bgcolor="#CCFFCC"
| 27 Oct 2018|| Win||align=left| Kiri Bradley || Destiny Muay Thai 10 || Brisbane, Australia || Decision (Unanimous) || 5 || 2:00
|-
|-  bgcolor="#FFBBBB"
| 17 May 2018|| Loss||align=left| Kana Morimoto || Krush 88 || Tokyo, Japan || Decision (Unanimous) || 3 || 3:00
|-
! style=background:white colspan=9 |
|-
|-  bgcolor="#CCFFCC"
| 7 Apr 2018|| Win||align=left| Kimberly Law || Destiny Muay Thai ||  Australia || Decision (Unanimous) || 5 || 2:00
|-
! style=background:white colspan=9 |
|-
|-  bgcolor="#FFBBBB"
| 9 Jul 2016|| Loss||align=left| Loma Lookboonmee || Epic Fight Promotions 15: Pride || Perth, Australia || Decision (Unanimous) || 5 || 2:00
|-
|-  bgcolor="#CCFFCC"
| 11 Oct 2015|| Win||align=left| Michelle Preston || Epic Fight Promotions 14 || Perth, Australia || Decision (Unanimous) || 5 || 2:00
|-
! style=background:white colspan=9 |
|-
|-  bgcolor="#CCFFCC"
| 28 Mar 2015|| Win||align=left| Nong Em Tor Vittaya || Epic Fight Promotions 13 || Perth, Australia || Decision (Unanimous) || 5 || 2:00
|-
|-  bgcolor="#CCFFCC"
| 27 Feb 2015|| Win||align=left| Natalie Edwards || Brute Force 3 || Melbourne, Australia || Decision (Split) || 5 || 2:00
|-
|-  bgcolor="#CCFFCC"
| 12 Oct 2014|| Win||align=left| Tali Silbermann || Epic Fight Promotions 12 || Perth, Australia || Decision (Unanimous) || 5 || 2:00
|-
|-  bgcolor="#CCFFCC"
| 10 Jul 2014|| Win||align=left| Nuengsian Sitpolek || Epic Fight Promotions 11 || Perth, Australia || Decision (Unanimous) || 5 || 2:00
|-
|-  bgcolor="#FFBBBB"
| 25 Aug 2012|| Loss||align=left| Rena Kubota || Shoot Boxing Girls S-Cup || Tokyo, Japan || Decision (Unanimous) || 3 || 2:00
|-
! style=background:white colspan=9 |
|-
|-
| colspan=9 | Legend''':

See also
List of female kickboxers
List of female ISKA champions

References

1988 births
Living people
Sportspeople from Perth, Western Australia
Australian Muay Thai practitioners
Female Muay Thai practitioners
Australian kickboxers
Flyweight kickboxers